Ebbe Frick is a Swedish sprint canoer who competed in the early to mid-1950s. He won three medals at the ICF Canoe Sprint World Championships with a gold (K-4 10000 m: 1954) and two silver (K-4 1000 m: 1950, 1954).

References

Swedish male canoeists
ICF Canoe Sprint World Championships medalists in kayak

Possibly living people

Year of birth missing